Maulana Ubaidullah Anwar (2 August 1926 – 27 April 1985) was a Pakistani Islamic scholar, politician and vice-emir of Jamiat Ulema-e-Islam. He was also president of Anjuman Khudamuddin Lahore, Madrasa Qasim Uloom Shiranwala Lahore and the patron of Weekly Khudamuddin. He is the son of the religious scholar Ahmed Ali Lahori.

Education 
After memorizing the Holy Qur'an in Lahore, he entered Mazahir Uloom, Saharanpur for primary and secondary education. Where he learned from Asadullah Rampuri, Abdul Rahman Kamilpuri and Jameel Ahmed Thanvi. Later, he went to Darul Uloom Deoband studied with Hussain Ahmed Madani, Muhammad Ibrahim Balyawi, Rasool Khan Hazarvi, Muhammad Shafi Deobandi and Muhammad Idris Kandhlawi, after completing Tafsir, Hadith, Jurisprudence and Kalam and graduated in 1947.

He pledged allegiance to his father and to Ahmed Ali Lahori and received the caliphate from him.

Teaching 
After graduation, he was appointed as a madrasa in Madrasa Mazharul Uloom Karachi. After about 6 years, he visited Lahore and started teaching on a platform of Misri Shah. Taught Quran for about 10 years.

Death 
He died on 7 Sha'ban 1405 AH (27 April 1985).

References

Sources 
 مولانا عبیداللہ انور : شخصیت اور جدو جہد : Maulānā ̒Ubaidullāh Anvar : Shaḵẖṣiyyat aur jidd o jahd (Personality and Struggle) / امجد علی شاکر : Amjad ̒Alī Shākir

Deobandis
1926 births
1985 deaths
Jamiat Ulema-e-Islam politicians
Mazahir Uloom alumni
Darul Uloom Deoband alumni